Pinois may refer to:
Le Pin, Loire-Atlantique inhabitants
Le Pin, Seine-et-Marne inhabitants